Cruchley may refer to:

 George Frederick Cruchley (1797-1880), English map-maker, engraver and publisher 
 Murray Cruchley, Canadian actor and radio personality. 
 Cruchley Ice Piedmont, ice piedmont in the South Orkney Islands.